Double Oak is a town in Denton County, Texas, United States. The population was 2,867 at the 2010 census.

Geography

Double Oak is located at  (33.064331, –97.110690).

Demographics

As of the census of 2000, there were 2,179 people, 682 households, and 632 families residing in the town. The population density was 1,001.4 people per square mile (385.9/km2). There were 709 housing units at an average density of 325.8 per square mile (125.6/km2). The racial makeup of the town was 94.08% White, 1.15% African American, 0.64% Native American, 0.96% Asian, 1.10% from other races, and 2.07% from two or more races. Hispanic or Latino of any race were 3.90% of the population.

There were 682 households, out of which 47.9% had children under the age of 18 living with them, 89.0% were married couples living together, 2.2% had a female householder with no husband present, and 7.2% were non-families. 5.4% of all households were made up of individuals, and 1.2% had someone living alone who was 65 years of age or older. The average household size was 3.19 and the average family size was 3.31.

In the town, the population was spread out, with 30.1% under the age of 18, 5.7% from 18 to 24, 26.5% from 25 to 44, 32.4% from 45 to 64, and 5.4% who were 65 years of age or older. The median age was 39 years. For every 100 females, there were 98.1 males. For every 100 females age 18 and over, there were 98.8 males.

The median income for a household in the town was $113,400, and the median income for a family was $114,063. Males had a median income of $81,398 versus $47,417 for females. The per capita income for the town was $41,632. About 0.3% of families and 1.4% of the population were below the poverty line, including none of those under the age of eighteen or sixty-five or over.

Education 
The majority of Double Oak is served by the Lewisville Independent School District, while a portion to the west is in the Denton Independent School District.

The Denton ISD part is zoned to Adkins Elementary School, Harpool Middle School, and Guyer High School.

Notable people
 Chris Barnes, professional bowler on PBA Tour
 Jochen Graf, professional soccer player for the Tampa Bay Rowdies

References

External links
 Town of Double Oak official website
 Double Oak Newspaper

Towns in Denton County, Texas
Towns in Texas
Dallas–Fort Worth metroplex